Jack Stephen Payne (born 5 December 1991) is an English professional footballer who plays as a midfielder for National League side Boreham Wood.

Career

Gillingham
He made his debut for Gillingham in a League Two match against Chester City on 25 October 2008, and signed an 18-month professional contract three months later. He was voted Young Player of the Year for Gillingham at the end of the 2008–09 season. He made his first senior start for the club on 8 August 2009 in a 5–0 League One victory over Swindon Town. Payne's form created interest from then Championship side Reading though no offer was ever lodged. Payne then signed a two-year extension in November 2011 to keep him at the club until 2015.

Peterborough United
In January 2013, Payne signed on loan for Championship club Peterborough United until the end of the season, with a view to a permanent move. Payne had been due to sign for the Posh in the summer of 2012, however the deal fell through. Payne made 14 appearances whilst on loan at Peterborough, having made his debut for the club on 2 February 2013 as an 84th-minute substitute in a 2–2 draw with Burnley. Peterborough finished 22nd in the Championship and were relegated to League One, whilst parent club Gillingham were promoted to League One as League Two champions. He joined Peterborough United on a permanent deal for an undisclosed fee in summer 2013. Payne featured as a 67th minute substitute when Peterborough defeated Chesterfield 3–1 in the 2013–14 EFL Trophy final at Wembley. Following the conclusion of the 2014–15 season, he was transfer-listed by the club.

On 1 September 2015, Payne went on a season-long loan to League Two club Leyton Orient, with an option for a permanent deal. He made his debut for the club on 12 September 2015 in a 1–1 draw with Cambridge United. He scored his first goal for the club on 24 October 2015 with the only goal of a 1–0 win away to Morecambe. He made 32 appearances for Orient across the 2015–16 season, and scored once.

Blackpool
In August 2016 he signed for Blackpool on a one-year deal. He left the club in May 2017 after his contract ended, shortly after featuring for the club in their League Two play-off final victory over Exeter City.

Ebbsfleet United
Payne signed for side Ebbsfleet United in June 2017. He made his debut for the Kent side in a 2–2 draw away to Guiseley on the opening day of the 2017–18 season.

He joined fellow National League side Eastleigh on a one-month loan in September 2018.

Eastleigh
Having rejected the offer of a new deal at Ebbsfleet, Payne joined Eastleigh permanently in June 2019, signing a one-year deal with the Hampshire side. He made his second debut for the side in a 1–0 victory over Notts County on 3 August 2019.

Crawley Town
Payne joined League Two side Crawley Town for an undisclosed fee on 1 July 2021 on an initial one-year deal, with the option of an additional year.

Boreham Wood
In July 2022, Payne joined Boreham Wood of the National League following the cancellation of his contract with Crawley.

Career statistics

Honours
Blackpool
EFL League Two play-offs: 2017

Gillingham
 EFL League Two: 2012–13

Peterborough
 EFL Trophy: 2013–14
Individual

 Gillingham Young Player of the Season: 2008–09, 2009–10, 2010–11

References

External links

1991 births
Living people
Sportspeople from Gravesend, Kent
English footballers
Association football midfielders
Gillingham F.C. players
Peterborough United F.C. players
Leyton Orient F.C. players
Blackpool F.C. players
Ebbsfleet United F.C. players
Eastleigh F.C. players
Crawley Town F.C. players
Boreham Wood F.C. players
English Football League players
National League (English football) players